This is a list of German television related events from 1976.

Events
1 February - Tony Marshall is selected to represent Germany at the 1976 Eurovision Song Contest with his song "Der Star". He is selected to be the twenty-first German Eurovision entry during Ein Lied für Den Haag held at the HR Studios in Frankfurt, but was later disqualified when it was discovered that the song had been performed in public prior to the national final. Les Humphries Singers, who were the runners-up performing "Sing Sang Song" were therefore promoted and announced as the twenty-first German Eurovision entry.

Debuts

ARD
 23 February – Plattenküche (1976–1980)
 25 February – Lobster (1976)
 16 March – Freiwillige Feuerwehr (1976)
 8 June – Inspektion Lauenstadt (1976)
 27 July – Schaurige Geschichten (1976)
 3 September – Die Unternehmungen des Herrn Hans (1976–1977)
 4 September – Vater Seidl und sein Sohn (1976–1978)
 13 September – Direktion City (1976–1982)
 26 October –  (1976)
 1 December – Notarztwagen 7 (1976–1977)
 2 December – Hans und Lene (1976–1977)
 19 December –  (1976)
 Unknown – Karl, der Gerechte (1976)
 Unknown – Partner gesucht (1976)
 Unknown – Schicht in Weiß (1976)
 Unknown – Pariser Geschichten (1976–1979)

ZDF
 7 January – Gesucht wird... (1976–1978)
 25 January – Der Knabe mit den 13 Vätern (1976)
 28 January –  Geburtstage (1976)
 1 April – Der Anwalt (1976–1978)
 7 April – Ein Fall für Stein (1976)
 7 July –  Zwickelbach & Co. (1976)
 15 July – Wege ins Leben  (1976)
 21 July – Block 7 (1976)
 21 October – Den lieben langen Tag (1976)
 12 November – Notsignale (1976)
 28 December – Michel Strogoff (1976–1977)

DFF
 8 October – Die Lindstedts (1976)
 31 December –  Maxe Baumann (1976–1982)

Television shows

1950s
Tagesschau (1952–present)

1960s
 heute (1963-present)

Ending this year
 Der Kommissar (since 1969)

Births
27 December - Sabine Heinrich, TV & radio host

Deaths